Ab Bariki (also Romanized as Āb Bārīkī, Āb-e Bārīkī, and Āb-i-Bārīkī) is a village in Kuhdasht-e Jonubi Rural District, in the Central District of Kuhdasht County, Lorestan Province, Iran. At the 2006 census, its population was 1,648, in 358 families.

References 

Towns and villages in Kuhdasht County